Gonzalo Leandro Baglivo (born 26 February 1996) is an Argentine professional footballer who plays as a midfielder for Deportivo Camioneros.

Career
Baglivo began in the youth academy of Argentina's Lanús, notably appearing at the 2016 U-20 Copa Libertadores having joined in 2006. In January 2017, Baglivo completed a move to Peruvian Primera División side UT Cajamarca. He made twenty-three appearances during his first season, one arrived in a 2–0 victory over Sport Huancayo on 14 April which he ended with his opening senior goal. Baglivo remained for two seasons in Peru after participating in forty-nine league fixtures whilst netting goals against Universidad San Martín, Ayacucho and Comerciantes Unidos; he also made appearances in the 2018 Copa Sudamericana.

On 24 January 2019, Baglivo was signed by Primera B Nacional's Deportivo Morón. His bow in Argentine football arrived in a draw with Independiente Rivadavia in February.

Personal life
Baglivo's brother, Enzo, is a fellow professional footballer.

Career statistics
.

References

External links

1996 births
Living people
People from Lanús Partido
Argentine footballers
Association football midfielders
Argentine expatriate footballers
Expatriate footballers in Peru
Argentine expatriate sportspeople in Peru
Peruvian Primera División players
Primera Nacional players
Torneo Federal A players
Universidad Técnica de Cajamarca footballers
Deportivo Morón footballers
Sportspeople from Buenos Aires Province